The Pedetidae are a family of mammals from the rodent order. The two living species, the springhares, are distributed throughout much of southern Africa and also around Kenya, Tanzania, and Uganda. Fossils have been found as far north as Turkey. Together with the anomalures and zenkerella, Pedetidae forms the suborder Anomaluromorpha. The fossil genus Parapedetes is also related.

Taxonomy 
The family includes one living genus and three extinct genera. The Asian fossil Diatomys was previously included, but is now classified in the family Diatomyidae with the Laotian rock rat.
Family Pedetidae
Genus Pedetes
South African springhare, P. capensis
†Pedetes gracilis
†Pedetes hagenstadti
East African springhare, P. surdaster
Genus †Megapedetes
†Megapedetes aegaeus
†Megapedetes gariepensis
†Megapedetes pentadactylus
Genus †Oldrichpedetes
†Oldrichpedetes brigitteae
†Oldrichpedetes fejfari
†Oldrichpedetes pickfordi
†Oldrichpedetes praecursor
Genus †Propedetes
†Propedetes efeldensis
†Propedetes laetoliensis
Genus †Rusingapedetes
†Rusingapedetes tsujikawai

References

Further reading
*Incisor enamel microstructure and phylogenetic interrelationships of Pedetidae and Ctenodactyloidea (Rodentia).
Einiges zur Haltung und Zucht Hornchenartiger (Sciuromorpha) im Zoologischen Garten.
Postcranial morphology and springing adaptations in Pedetidae from Arrisdrift, Middle Miocene (Namibia).
Pelvic shape in gliding rodents: implications for the launch.
Tracking genome organization in rodents by Zoo-FISH.
Feldhamer, G. A., L. C. Drickamer, S. H. Vessey, and J. F. Merritt. 1999. Mammalogy. Adaptation, Diversity, and Ecology. WCB McGraw-Hill, Boston. xii+563pp.
McLaughlin, C. A. 1984. Protrogomorph, sciuromorph, castorimorph, myomorph (geomyoid, anomaluroid, pedetoid, and ctenodactyloid) rodents. pp. 267–288 in Anderson, S. and J. K. Jones, Jr. (eds). Orders and Families of Recent Mammals of the World. John Wiley and Sons, N.Y. xii+686 pp.
Paradiso, J. L. 1975. Walker's Mammals of the World, Third Edition. Johns Hopkins University Press, Baltimore.
Savage, R. J. G. and M. R. Long. 1986. Mammal Evolution, an Illustrated Guide. Facts of File Publications, New York. 259 pp.
Vaughan, T. A. 1986. Mammalogy. Third Edition. Saunders College Publishing, Fort Worth. vii+576 pp.
Vaughan, T. A., J. M. Ryan, N. J. Czaplewski. 2000. Mammalogy. Fourth Edition. Saunders College Publishing, Philadelphia. vii+565pp.
Wilson, D. E., and D. M. Reeder. 1993. Mammal Species of the World, A Taxonomic and Geographic Reference. 2nd edition. Smithsonian Institution Press, Washington. xviii+1206 pp.

 
Anomaluromorpha
 
Rodent families
Extant Miocene first appearances
Taxa named by John Edward Gray